Baczyna  is a village in the administrative district of Gmina Lubiszyn, within Lubiszyn County, Lubuskie Voivodeship, in west Poland.

The village has a population of 170.

References

Villages in Końskie County